Buccaneer Bay is a name for many water and amusement parks, such as:

 Buccaneer Bay, a pirate themed children's play area at Wet'n'Wild Gold Coast
 Buccaneer Bay, a pirate themed children's play area at Zoombezi Bay
 Buccaneer Bay, a pirate themed children's play area at Six Flags Great America
 Buccaneer Bay, a pirate themed children's play area at Six Flags White Water
 Buccaneer Bay, a pirate themed children's play area at Oceans of Fun
 Buccaneer Bay, a pirate themed children's play area at Splash! in La Mirada, California
 Buccaneer Bay, a water park at Weeki Wachee Springs
 Buccaneer Bay, an area with nightly staged pirate battles at Treasure Island Hotel and Casino

See also
 Tampa Bay Buccaneers, an American football team
 Buccaneer Bay Provincial Park, a provincial park in British Columbia, Canada
 Bay City Buccaneers, a member American football team of Gridiron Australia